Zhu Jianhua (born 29 May 1963) is a retired Chinese high jumper. His personal best of 2.39 metres is a former world record for the event, and is still the Chinese record.

In Helsinki 1983, Zhu became China's first man to win a medal in the IAAF World Championships. In the 1984 Los Angeles Olympics, he became the first male from the People's Republic of China to win an athletics medal in the history of the Olympic Games (Yang Chuan-kwang won a silver medal representing the Republic of China in the 1960 Rome Olympics). He is a two-time gold medallist at both the Asian Games and the Asian Athletics Championships.

Career
Dominating Asian high jumping in the early 1980s, Zhu won the Asian Championships in 1981, crushing the championship record by 15 centimetres. He repeated this at the 1982 Asian Games with a jump of 2.33 m, beating the previous games record by 12 cm. He retained his title in the 1986 Asian Games.

At the inaugural World Championships in 1983 and the 1984 Summer Olympics he competed against the world elite, finishing third on both occasions. Zhu's Olympic performance brought anger as well as pride back home in China – those disappointed he had not won gold, smashed the windows of his home.

On June 11, 1983, Zhu jumped 2.37 m, setting a new world record. He would go on to reach 2.38 and even 2.39 m, the latter on June 10, 1984. Prior to the 1984 Olympics Zhu cleared eight feet in practice, becoming unofficially the first man to clear this height. The world record stood until August 11, 1985, when Rudolf Povarnitsyn beat it by one centimetre. His 2.39 m jump in 1984 was the oldest Asian record among all Olympic events in athletics and lasted until 2013, when Mutaz Essa Barshim from Qatar jumped 2.40 m.

Zhu's indoor best of 2.31 m stood as the Chinese indoor record from 1986 until 2012, when Zhang Guowei jumped a centimetre higher.

Achievements

See also
China at the World Championships in Athletics

References

External links
 
 

1963 births
Living people
Chinese male high jumpers
Athletes from Shanghai
World record setters in athletics (track and field)
Olympic athletes of China
Athletes (track and field) at the 1984 Summer Olympics
Athletes (track and field) at the 1988 Summer Olympics
Olympic bronze medalists for China
Asian Games medalists in athletics (track and field)
Athletes (track and field) at the 1982 Asian Games
Athletes (track and field) at the 1986 Asian Games
World Athletics Championships medalists
Medalists at the 1984 Summer Olympics
Olympic bronze medalists in athletics (track and field)
Universiade medalists in athletics (track and field)
Asian Games gold medalists for China
Medalists at the 1982 Asian Games
Medalists at the 1986 Asian Games
Universiade silver medalists for China
Medalists at the 1981 Summer Universiade
20th-century Chinese people